The following is a list of MTV Pilipinas winners for Favorite International Video.

References

1 While the said award category was first introduced in 2004, it was removed in 2005 and was re-introduced in 2006.

MTV Pilipinas Music Awards